The 1975 RAC Southern Organs British Saloon Car Championship was the 18th season of the championship. The title was won by Andy Rouse, driving a Triumph Dolomite Sprint.

Calendar & Winners
All races were held in the United Kingdom. Overall winners in bold.

Championship results

Manufacturers results

References

British Touring Car Championship seasons
Saloon